is a Japanese badminton player.

Career 
Gunji was the finalist in the Under-15 at the 2016 Singapore Youth International Series. In the same tournament, she won the girls' doubles title with partner Akari Nakashizu. She was the girls' singles Under-17 champion of 2017 Singapore Youth International Series beating Peeraya Khantaruangsakul of Thailand. She won the bronze medal in 2018 BWF World Junior Championships mixed team event. In the girls' singles, she lost in the second round to China's Wang Zhiyi.

In 2019, she reached the final of Dutch Junior International where she earned second best position after losing to China's Han Qianxi. She lost another final at the India Junior International event to Thai player Benyapa Aimsaard. In 2019 World Junior Championships, she entered the tournament seeded 7th. She went on to stun several higher seeded players in the tournament. She defeated Thailand's Phittayaporn Chaiwan in semifinal, who was a top seeded player in 2 straight games. In the final she won the World Junior title, beating out China's Zhou Meng.

Achievements

World Junior Championships 
Girls' singles

BWF World Tour (1 runner-up) 
The BWF World Tour, which was announced on 19 March 2017 and implemented in 2018, is a series of elite badminton tournaments sanctioned by the Badminton World Federation (BWF). The BWF World Tour is divided into levels of World Tour Finals, Super 1000, Super 750, Super 500, Super 300 (part of the HSBC World Tour), and the BWF Tour Super 100.

Women's singles

BWF International Challenge/Series (4 titles, 2 runners-up) 
Women's singles

  BWF International Challenge tournament
 BWF International Series tournament
 BWF Future Series tournament

BWF Junior International (2 runners-up) 
Girls' singles

  BWF Junior International Grand Prix tournament
  BWF Junior International Challenge tournament
  BWF Junior International Series tournament
  BWF Junior Future Series tournament

References

External links 

2002 births
Living people
People from Ebina, Kanagawa
Sportspeople from Kanagawa Prefecture
Japanese female badminton players
21st-century Japanese women